On February 25, 1986, around 25,000 conscripts of the Central Security Forces (CSF), Egyptian paramilitary force, staged violent protests in and around Cairo. The riot came as a reaction to the rumour that their three-year compulsory service would be prolonged by one additional year without any additional benefits or rank promotion.

The incited conscripts targeted tourist areas and destroyed two hotels. The regime of Mubarak relied on the Armed Forces to crush the mutiny, thus when the poorly paid and poorly armed CSF mutinied, the military was sent in to restore order. The Army deployed tanks and armoured personnel carriers and commando snipers to hunt down the rebelling conscripts, most of whom were unarmed or armed only with shields, batons, and assault rifles. In Upper Egypt and near Giza, the Army Aviation and the Air Force used helicopters and fighter jets to attack the rebelling conscripts, causing many deaths. At least four to five helicopters, and three fighter jets, were used in the operation. The Air Force officer in command of the operation was Ahmed Shafik, as commander of all MiG-21 fleets in the Central Military Zone.

The riot lasted for three days, more than 8000 died mostly CSF personnel, according to official reports. Over 20,000 conscripts were dismissed from service with no benefits, and the agitators received correctional punishment after being tried before State Security Court for arson, violent riots, and insubordination according to penal code. Some reports related that mutiny to a conspiracy against the Minister of Interior in charge by then (Gen. Ahmed Roshdy) due to his policies. After the suppression the government promised to overhaul the force by raising its entry standards, increasing payment and bettering living conditions in their camps.

See also 
Egyptian Revolution of 2011
1977 Egyptian bread riots
List of modern conflicts in the Middle East

References

1986 in Egypt
1986 riots
Arab rebellions
Egypt
Republic of Egypt
Riots and civil disorder in Egypt